Milan Stanković (born 9 September 1987) is a Serbian singer-songwriter. He rose to prominence as a finalist on the televised singing competition Zvezde Granda in 2007, and acquired wider fame by representing Serbia at the Eurovision Song Contest 2010 in Oslo, Norway with "Ovo je Balkan", where he finished in 13th place.

Additionally, he served as a judge on the children's singing competition Pinkove Zvezdice (2014-2018).

Early life 
Milan Stanković was born on September 9, 1987 in Obrenovac, SFR Yugoslavia and was raised by a single mother. According to Stanković, his father, who was arrested for homicide when Milan was five months old, died after five years in prison under unexplained circumstances. He has a sister from his mother's second marriage. Stanković graduated from a secondary medical school.

Career

2007-2010: Career beginnings and Eurovision 
Stanković gained initial fame as a contestant on the third season of the singing competition show Zvezde Granda in 2007, where he placed 4th. Recognized for performing mostly songs by Zdravko Čolić, he received widespread public attention due to his k-pop influenced appearance and relationship with fellow-contestant Rada Manojlović. Two years following the competition, Stanković released his debut album Solo under Grand Production, which was sold in circulation of 50,000 copies.

On 13 March 2010, Stanković competed against singers Emina Jahović and Olivera Katić in the national selection competition organized by Radio Television of Serbia to chose Serbian representative for the Eurovision Song Contest 2010 in Oslo, Norway. By receiving 45% of the public votes, he ended up winning the festival with his entry, titled "Ovo je Balkan", written by Goran Bregović, Marina Tucaković and Ljiljana Jorgovanović. During the first semi-final of the Eurovision, held on 25 May, Stanković performed seventh, placing fifth and thus qualifying to the final. On May 27, he performed eighth and finished in the 13th place with 72 points.

2011-2020: Milan and collaboration with Jala & Buba  
After Eurovision, Stanković was dropped from Grand Production due to breech of contract, according to its then CEO and owner Saša Popović. This situation, along with his breakup with Rada Manojlović, led Milan to take a brief hiatus from public. In September 2013, Stanković released the single "Od mene se odvikavaj". He than participated in the Pink Music Festival 2014 with "Luda ženo", where he received three awards. In September 2014, he also became a judge on the children's singing competition Pinkove Zvezdice, on which he continued appearing for four non-consecutive seasons. On 3 March 2015, Stanković announced his sophomore album by releasing two singles - "Mašina" and "Nisi mu ti žena". In July, he collaborated with Serbian rapper Mimi Mercedez and turbo-folk singer Mile Kitić on the single "Gadure". In September, he released his eponymous EP under City Records, which featured previously released singles and three new songs.

In February 2017, Milan released single "Ego" featuring Bosnian hip hop duo Jala Brat and Buba Corelli. As of May 2022, the music video has collected over eighty million views on YouTube, making it his biggest song on this platform. Between 2018 and 2019, he released three more singles - "Trans", "Kripton" (2018) and "Brane mi te" (2019), as a part of his so-called "Tokyo trilogy". Stanković worked with Jala Brat and Buba Corelli once again on the single "Pablo", released in July 2020.

Discography
Studio albums and EPs
Solo (2009)
Milan (2015)

Non-album singles
"Ovo je Balkan" (2010)
"Ego" (2017), feat. Jala Brat & Buba Corelli 
"Sve što ne smemo" (2017). feat. Ina Gardijan
"Trans" (2018)
"Kripton" (2018)
"Brane mi te" (2019)
"Pablo" (2020), feat. Jala Brat & Buba Corelli

Awards and nominations

Music festivals
Tri pa jedan za Oslo (2010); winner
Eurovision Song Contest 2010; 13th place
Pink Music Festival 2014; 7th place

See also
Music of Serbia
Zvezde Granda
Eurovision Song Contest 2010

References

External links

Living people
1987 births
People from Obrenovac
21st-century Serbian male singers
Serbian pop singers
Serbian folk-pop singers
Grand Production artists
Eurovision Song Contest entrants for Serbia
Eurovision Song Contest entrants of 2010